The 1939–40 National Football League was the 13th staging of the National Football League, an annual Gaelic football tournament for the Gaelic Athletic Association county teams of Ireland.

After winning six NFL titles in a row, Mayo did not play in the league this season, on the grounds that petrol rationing (due to The Emergency / Second World War) would make playing in the NFL prohibitively expensive. They were also protesting events during the 1939 All-Ireland semi-final replay. In their absence, Galway won the League.

Format 
There were four divisions – Northern, Southern, Eastern and Western. Division winners played off for the NFL title.

Knockout stage qualifiers
The winners of Division A, B and C each progressed to the semi-Finals. 
The Winners of Divisions D, E, F and G each contested the inter-group play-offs for the fourth semi-final place.

Results

Group A

Results

Table

Group B

Wexford finished top, ahead of Carlow, Waterford and Tipperary.

Group C
Meath finished top, ahead of Dublin, Louth and Monaghan.

Group D

Table

Group E

Table

Group F

Table

Group G

Cork finished top, ahead of Clare and Limerick.

Knockout phase

Inter-group play-offs

Semi-finals

Final

References

National Football League
National Football League
National Football League (Ireland) seasons